Dominic Joseph "Dom" Campedelli (born April 3, 1964) is a retired American professional ice hockey defenceman who played 2 games in the National Hockey League for the Montreal Canadiens.

Playing career
Played for Cohasset HS MA and battled future Boston College team mate and NHLer Scott Harlow of East Bridgewater HS MA.Campedelli was drafted in the 7th Round, 129th overall by the Toronto Maple Leafs in the 1982 NHL Entry Draft. Campedelli appeared in 2 games for the Canadiens during the 1985–86 NHL season.

Career statistics

Awards and honors

References

External links
 

1964 births
Boston College Eagles men's ice hockey players
Hershey Bears players
Ice hockey players from Massachusetts
Living people
Montreal Canadiens players
Nova Scotia Oilers players
People from Cohasset, Massachusetts
Sherbrooke Canadiens players
Toronto Maple Leafs draft picks
American men's ice hockey defensemen